Ampheremus cylindricollis is a species of beetle in the family Buprestidae, the only species in the genus Ampheremus.

References

Monotypic Buprestidae genera